Fractal Possession is the seventh studio album by Austrian black metal band Abigor. It was released worldwide in 2007.

Track listing

Credits 
 A.R. (Arthur Rosar) - Vocals
 P.K. (Virus 666, Peter Kubik) - Guitars, Bass
 T.T. (Thomas Tannenberger) - Drums, Guitars

External links
 Encyclopaedia Metallum - Abigor: Fractal Possession
 [ Allmusic - Abigor: Fractal Possession]

References 

2007 albums
Abigor albums
Season of Mist albums